Mazahua may refer to:
 Mazahua people, an indigenous people of Mexico
 Mazahua language, the Oto-Pamean language spoken by the Mazahua people

Language and nationality disambiguation pages